Vice Squad Dick is a collaborative EP by Foetus and Chrome Cranks, released in 1994 by PCP Entertainment. The title track depicts a cartoonish distillation of the life of a detective and is a cover of a track that was allegedly recorded in 1979 by Dick Uranus.

Track listing

Personnel
Adapted from the Vice Squad Dick liner notes.
 Chrome Cranks – vocals, instruments, production and engineering (2, 4)
 J. G. Thirlwell (as Foetus) – vocals, instruments, production and engineering (1, 3)

Release history

References

External links 
 
 Vice Squad Dick at foetus.org

1994 EPs
Foetus (band) albums
Albums produced by JG Thirlwell